The Asteroid Redirect Mission (ARM), also known as the Asteroid Retrieval and Utilization (ARU) mission and the Asteroid Initiative, was a space mission proposed by NASA in 2013; the mission was later cancelled. The Asteroid Retrieval Robotic Mission (ARRM) spacecraft would rendezvous with a large near-Earth asteroid and use robotic arms with anchoring grippers to retrieve a 4-meter boulder from the asteroid.

The spacecraft would characterize the asteroid and demonstrate at least one planetary defense technique before transporting the boulder to a stable lunar orbit, where it could be further analyzed both by robotic probes and by a future crewed mission, Asteroid Redirect Crewed Mission (ARCM).  If funded, the mission would have launched in December 2021, with the additional objectives to test a number of new capabilities needed for future human expeditions to deep space, including advanced ion thrusters.

The proposed 2018 NASA budget called for its cancellation, the mission was given its notice of defunding in April 2017, and NASA announced the "close out" on June 13, 2017. Key technologies being developed for ARM have continued, especially the ion thruster propulsion system that would have been flown on the robotic mission.

Objectives

The main objective of the Asteroid Redirect Mission was to develop deep space exploration capabilities needed in preparation for a human mission to Mars and other Solar System destinations per NASA's Journey to Mars flexible pathways.

Mars precursor

Space tug missions, to disaggregate non-time-critical Mars logistics from crew, can reduce the costs by as much as 60% (if using advanced solar electric propulsion (ion engines)) and reduces overall mission risk by enabling on-site check-out of critical systems before the crew departs.

Not only would the solar electric propulsion (SEP) technologies and designs be applied to future missions, but the ARRM spacecraft would be left in a stable orbit for reuse.  The project has baselined any of multiple refueling capabilities; the asteroid-specific payload is at one end of the bus, for possible removal and replacement via future servicing, or as a separable spacecraft, leaving a qualified space tug in cislunar space.

Expanded and sustainable deep space operations

The robotic and crewed missions would demonstrate capabilities past Earth orbit, yet within a few days' return contingency.  Lunar Distant Retrograde Orbit (DRO), encompassing Earth-Moon L1 and L2, is essentially a node for Earth system escape and capture.  This is more so if an Exploration Augmentation Module (EAM) is brought for extended human stays, possibly by an ARRM-like SEP module.  On its return leg from Mars, a human mission may save tons of mass by capturing into DRO, and transferring to a parked Orion for Earth return and reentry.

Additional objectives
A secondary objective was to develop the required technology to bring a small near-Earth asteroid into lunar orbit – "the asteroid was a bonus." There, it could be analyzed by the crew of the Orion EM-5 or EM-6 ARCM mission in 2026.

Additional mission aims included demonstrating planetary defense techniques able to protect the Earth in the future – such as using robotic spacecraft to deflect potentially hazardous asteroids. Under consideration for deflecting an asteroid are: grabbing the asteroid and directly moving it, as well as employing gravity tractor techniques after collecting a boulder from its surface to increase mass ("enhanced gravity tractor").

The mission would also test the performance of advanced solar electric propulsion (ion engines) and broad-band laser communication in space. These new technologies would help send the large amounts of cargo, habitats, and propellant to Mars in advance of a human mission to Mars and/or Phobos.

Spacecraft overview

 

The vehicle would land on a large asteroid and grippers on the end of the robotic arms would grasp and secure a boulder from the surface of a large asteroid. The grippers would dig into the boulder and create a strong grip. An integrated drill would be used to provide final anchoring of the boulder to the capture mechanism. Once the boulder is secured, the legs would push off and provide an initial ascent without the use of thrusters.

Propulsion
The spacecraft would be propelled by advanced solar electric propulsion (SEP) (possibly a Hall effect thruster, see Ion thruster).  Electricity would be provided by high efficiency UltraFlex-style solar panels (50 kW).

The advanced ion engine uses 10% of the propellant required by equivalent chemical rockets, it can process three times the power of previous designs, and increase efficiency by 50%. It would use the Hall-effect, which provides low acceleration but can fire continuously for many years to thrust a large mass to high speed. Hall effect thrusters trap electrons in a magnetic field and use them to ionize the onboard xenon gas propellant. The magnetic field also generates an electric field that accelerates the charged ions creating an exhaust plume of plasma that pushes the spacecraft forward. The spacecraft concept would have a dry mass of 5.5 tons, and could store up to 13 tons of xenon propellant.

Each thruster would have a 30- to 50-kilowatt power level, and several thrusters can be combined to increase the power of an SEP spacecraft. This engine, which is scalable to 300 kilowatts and beyond, is being researched and developed by Northrop Grumman with Sandia National Laboratories and the University of Michigan. NASA Glenn Research Center is managing the project.

Even at a destination, the SEP system can be configured to provide power to maintain the systems or prevent propellant boil-off before the crew arrives.  However, existing flight-qualified solar-electric propulsion is at levels of 1–5 kW.  A Mars cargo mission would require ~100 kW, and a crewed flight ~150–300 kW.

Proposed timeline
Originally planned for 2017, then 2020, and then for December 2021. The mission was given its notice of defunding in April 2017. The launch vehicle would have been either a Delta IV Heavy, SLS or Falcon Heavy. The boulder would have  arrived in lunar orbit by late 2025.

Target asteroid
, 16,950 near-Earth asteroids are known, having been discovered by various search teams and catalogued as potentially hazardous objects. By early 2017 NASA had yet to select a target for ARM, but for planning and simulation purposes, the near-Earth asteroid  was used as an example for the spacecraft to pick up a single  boulder from it. Other candidate parent asteroids were Itokawa, Bennu, and Ryugu.

The carbonaceous boulder that would have been captured by the mission (maximum 6 meter diameter, 20 tons) is too small to harm the Earth because it would burn up in the atmosphere. Redirecting the asteroid mass to a distant retrograde orbit around the Moon would ensure it could not hit Earth and also leave it in a stable orbit for future studies.

History
NASA Administrator Robert Frosch testified to Congress on "asteroid retrieval to Earth" in July 1980.  However, he stated that it was infeasible at the time.

The ARU mission, excluding any human missions to an asteroid which it may enable, was the subject of a feasibility study in 2012 by the Keck Institute for Space Studies. The mission cost was estimated by the Glenn Research Center at about $2.6 billion, of which $105 million was funded in 2014 to mature the concept.  NASA officials emphasized that ARM was intended as one step in the long-term plans for a human mission to Mars.

 
This option was identified as more relevant to future rendezvous, autonomous docking, lander, sampler, planetary defense, mining, and spacecraft servicing technologies.

The crewed portion to retrieve asteroid samples from the Moon orbit (Orion EM-3) was criticized as an unnecessary part of the mission with claims that thousands of meteorites have already been analyzed and that the technology used to retrieve one boulder does not help develop a crewed mission to Mars. The plans were not changed despite the NASA Advisory Council suggested on April 10, 2015 that NASA should not carry out its plans for ARM, and should instead develop solar electric propulsion and use it to power a spacecraft on a round-trip flight to Mars.

In January 2016 contracts were awarded by NASA's Jet Propulsion Laboratory (JPL) for design studies for a solar electric propulsion-based spacecraft. The robotic ARRM mission would have been the first phase of ARM. The contracts were won by Lockheed Martin Space Systems, Littleton, Colorado; Boeing Phantom Works, Huntington Beach, California; Orbital ATK, Dulles, Virginia; and Space Systems/Loral, Palo Alto, California.

In May 2016, ASI (the Italian Space Agency) agreed to a joint study, and possible Italian participation.

Under the 2018 NASA budget proposed by the Trump administration in March 2017, this mission was cancelled. On June 13, 2017 NASA announced a "closeout phase" following the defund. NASA has emphasized that key technologies being developed for ARM will continue, especially the solar electric propulsion system, which would have been flown on the robotic mission, which will be used on the Lunar Gateway as the Power and Propulsion Element.

See also

 Asteroid capture
 Asteroid impact avoidance
 Near-Earth asteroids
 Potentially hazardous object
 Double Asteroid Redirection Test

References

External links 

 Asteroid Initiative Program by NASA 
YouTube videos
 Video: Asteroid Redirect Mission, 'Option A', Capture of an 8m free-flying asteroid.
 Video: Asteroid Redirect Mission, 'Option B', Boulder collection from a large asteroid.
 Video: Asteroid Redirect Mission: Crewed Orion spacecraft rendezvous with ARM in lunar orbit
 Video: Asteroid Redirect Mission: Robotic Segment NASA

Missions to near-Earth asteroids
Cancelled spacecraft
Planetary defense
NASA programs
Articles containing video clips
Projects established in 2013
Projects disestablished in 2017
Lunar Gateway
Asteroid mining